Adarsh Anand Shinde (born 7 March 1988) is an Indian playback singer. He records Ambedkarite songs and Marathi language film songs.

Early life 
Adarsh Shinde comes from a family of singers. His father, Anand Shinde, and grandfather, Prahlad Shinde, were also singers. Shinde started learning to sing at the age of ten. He had lessons in classical music from Suresh Wadkar. The Shinde family is influenced by B. R. Ambedkar and follows Buddhism.

Shinde married Neha Lele on 27 May 2015 in a Buddhist marriage held in Mumbai.

Career 
Adarsh Shinde is a notable Ambedkarite singer. He has sung many songs about B. R. Ambedkar and Buddhism. He started his career by singing on an album with his father and uncle Milind Shinde. He appeared on the television reality show "Let It Go!"

In 2014, the Shinde family sang together for the film Priyatma, which was the first such incident of three generations singing together in the Marathi film industry. Bhimraya Majha Bhimraya is the title song of the Dr. Babasaheb Ambedkar series composed by Adarsh Shinde and his brother Utkarsh Shinde, while sung by Adarsh Shinde.

Adarsh Shinde has sung more than 1500 songs in both Marathi and Hindi languages.

Playback singing

Marathi Album songs

Filmography

Television

References

External links
 
 
 

Living people
Bollywood playback singers
Indian male playback singers
Marathi playback singers
Marathi-language singers
Indian male folk singers
Dalit artists
1988 births
Indian Buddhists
Buddhist artists
20th-century Buddhists
21st-century Buddhists